The following list is of important municipalities in Castilla-La Mancha, an autonomous community of Spain:

Provincial lists
The following links are to lists which are more detailed province-specific, and all municipalities in a given province are ranked by population.
List of municipalities in Albacete
List of municipalities in Ciudad Real
List of municipalities in Cuenca
List of municipalities in Guadalajara
List of municipalities in Toledo

By population

Castilla–La Mancha